Navy is a perfume originally created by CoverGirl and now owned by Dana Classic Fragrances. It was released as a women's fragrance in 1990 and a later version was released for men in 1995 (FragranceX however places the release in 1996).

The women's fragrance is considered oriental floral and contains a blend of peach, orange blossom, jasmine, ylang-ylang, rose, amber, musk, vanilla, coriander and cinnamon. The men's fragrance contains juniper berry, leather, tangerine, nutmeg, geranium, sage, water lily, water mint, lavender, siam wood, balsam fir and musk.

References

External links
Dana Classic Fragrances
Oud Oils Website

Perfumes
Products introduced in 1990
Products introduced in 1995